Liem Swie King (born 28 February 1956) is an Indonesian former badminton player who excelled from the late 1970s through the mid-1980s. He won the All England in 1978, 1979 and 1981. He was one of the world's leading singles players of his era. A world level player in men's doubles as well as men's singles, he was known for the ferocity of his jumping smash.

Early life
Liem was born on 28 February 1956 in Kudus Regency, Central Java. His parents were Ng Thian Poo and Oei See Moi from Putian, Fujian. He was the only son of eight children. During elementary school, he studied at Sekolah Tionghoa, and later moved to SD Negeri Dema'an II in 1965. In 1974, he chose a name suggested by his older sister, Guntur (meaning: thunder), in order to comply with government direction for any Indonesian with Chinese name to adopt what is considered as an "Indonesian name", however it did not affect how people addressed him in public or in competition. His physical trainer, Tahir Djide, said, "It is easier to pronounce King, rather than Guntur".

Career
While watching a local badminton competition, Budi Hartono, the owner of a prestigious badminton club, Djarum Badminton Club, recognized Liem's talent at the age of 14. Despite the loss he took in the final match, Liem was invited to join the club. With proper coaching, it did not take long for the teenage Liem to start overwhelming opponents with his fast-paced style in various local youth badminton tournaments.

In 1972 at the age of 15, Liem became the junior single champion of Central Java. In November 1972, he tasted his first international tournament, the First Djakarta Badminton Open Tournament, defeating Singapore's Ng Choi Yu in the first stage, before succumbing to Thailand's Sangob Ratananusorn. Later, he won Moenadi Cup, in men's singles and men's doubles categories, pairing with his childhood friend, Hariamanto Kartono.

In 1973, Liem was called to join the provincial badminton squad for National Sports Competition (Pekan Olahraga Nasional) VIII. He reached the men's singles final by defeating senior players, before finally losing to a veteran national squad member, Iie Sumirat. In the same year, he won a local tournament, Kejuaraan Dunia Bulu Tangkis Piala Garuda (Garuda Cup Badminton World Championship) in Tegal.

While still in high school, in 1974, Liem won the national championship. In the same year he participated in the All England for the first time. Later on, Liem won the All-England Men's Singles Championships in 1978, 1979 and 1981 during a six-consecutive-year run to the finals (1976–1981) of what was then perhaps the world's most prestigious badminton tournament. He was the runner-up at the then triennial World Championships in both 1980 and 1983 to, consecutively, fellow Indonesians Rudy Hartono and Icuk Sugiarto. He was a member of the Thomas Cup winning Indonesian teams of 1976, 1979, and 1984, playing both singles and doubles on the latter two occasions. He also played in the Thomas Cup in the years 1982 and 1986. He was a bronze medalist in the men's doubles together with Kartono at the 1985 IBF World Championships in Calgary.

He retired from badminton in 1988, and now owns a health spa in Jakarta.

"King Smash" 
Liem's is well known for his iconic jumping smash, which has been recognized as the most aggressive type of offensive strokes in badminton. Although some players were claimed to originate the move, Liem was widely accepted as the man who popularized the jumping smash.  Unlike most pro players before him, who used hopping leg action to compensate the lateral gap to reach the shuttlecock, Liem effectively used a higher vertical leap in executing his smash.

As his popularity increased, badminton enthusiasts around the world began to associate that kind of hard-hitting, leaping smash with Liem, earning it the nickname King Smash. Liem's move was considered revolutionary during his era, but now it has become a standard attacking skill for badminton pros.

Liem's vertical leap explosiveness came from his low crouching stance before launching his jump, he then intercepted the shuttlecock at high altitude with a ferocious whipping strike, or sometimes a deceptive drop shot which immobilized his opponent who was expecting a slamming hit from him. By intercepting the shuttlecock at higher altitude, Liem was able to deliver a shot with steeper angle. Given his average stature, his jump-smash made a quite dramatic visual for the spectators, due to the perceived height of his leap. In an interview, Liem explained that he began to do jump-smash around 1977. He liked fast-paced style and simply wanted to hit the shuttlecock quicker. No coaches complained about it since they saw it improved Liem's game.

Racket known to have been used by Liem is Carbonex 15.

Personal life 
King met his wife Lucia Alamsah in 1976 and they have three children, Alexander, Stephanie and Michelle. King's life and achievements were the inspiration for the 2009 Indonesian movie "King" (2009) in which he made a cameo appearance. That same year, Robert Adhi Kusumaputra published a biography on the Indonesian legend, titled "Call Me, King" (Panggil Aku, King).

Awards and nominations

Achievements

IBF World Championships 
Men's Singles

Men's Doubles

World Cup 
Men's singles

Men's doubles

World Games 
Men's singles

Asian Games 
Men's singles

Men's doubles

Asian Championships 
Men's singles

Southeast Asian Games 
Men's singles

Men's doubles

International Open Tournaments (14 titles, 8 runners-up)
Men's singles

Men's doubles

 IBF Grand Prix tournament
 IBF Grand Prix Finals tournament

Award
Liem was inducted into the Badminton Hall of Fame in 2002.

References

Bibliography

External links
 

1956 births
Living people
Indonesian male badminton players
Indonesian Christians
Indonesian people of Chinese descent
Indonesian Hokkien people
World Games medalists in badminton
World Games bronze medalists
Competitors at the 1981 World Games
Asian Games medalists in badminton
Asian Games gold medalists for Indonesia
Asian Games silver medalists for Indonesia
Asian Games bronze medalists for Indonesia
Badminton players at the 1974 Asian Games
Badminton players at the 1978 Asian Games
Badminton players at the 1982 Asian Games
Badminton players at the 1986 Asian Games
Medalists at the 1974 Asian Games
Medalists at the 1978 Asian Games
Medalists at the 1982 Asian Games
Medalists at the 1986 Asian Games
Southeast Asian Games gold medalists for Indonesia
Southeast Asian Games silver medalists for Indonesia
Southeast Asian Games medalists in badminton
Competitors at the 1977 Southeast Asian Games
Competitors at the 1979 Southeast Asian Games
Competitors at the 1981 Southeast Asian Games
Competitors at the 1983 Southeast Asian Games
Competitors at the 1985 Southeast Asian Games
Competitors at the 1987 Southeast Asian Games
People from Kudus Regency
20th-century Indonesian people